Moraine Bluff is a bluff in Antarctica,  high, on the east side of Skelton Glacier, lying north of Red Dike Bluff. It was surveyed and named in 1957 by the New Zealand party of the Commonwealth Trans-Antarctic Expedition (1956–58), and so named because a long morainic strip extends from the foot of the bluff on to Skelton Glacier.

References

Cliffs of the Ross Dependency
Hillary Coast